Ursula St Barbe (died 18 June 1602), also known as Ursula, Lady Worsley and Ursula, Lady Walsingham, was a lady at the court of Queen Elizabeth I of England.

She was the daughter of Henry St Barbe, of Ashington, Somerset, by his wife, Eleanor Lewknor. She first married Sir Richard Worsley, who was the captain of the Isle of Wight. After his death, she married Sir Francis Walsingham in 1566.

The following year, her two sons by Worsley, John and George, were killed along with others in an accidental gunpowder explosion at the Worsley estate on the Isle of Wight, Appuldurcombe. Gunpowder had been laid out to dry in the gatehouse, where the boys had lessons, when a stray spark ignited it. With Walsingham, Ursula had two daughters: Frances, who was born in about October 1567 and married Sir Philip Sidney, and Mary, who was born in early January 1573 and died in 1580.

During Walsingham's time as an ambassador to France, in 1572, the St. Bartholomew's Day Massacre of Huguenots took place. His house in Paris acted as a refuge for Protestants during the terror. As soon as it was deemed safe, Ursula and her daughter fled to England, where she was reunited with her husband in April 1573.

Her husband was acquainted with the mathematician and astrologer John Dee, and her daughter Frances stood godmother to Dee's daughter Madima. Ursula's sister, Edith, was the wife of Robert Beale, clerk of the Privy Council.

Lady Walsingham died at her home in Barn Elms on 18 June 1602, and was buried the following night in Old St Paul's Cathedral, London.

References

16th-century births
1602 deaths
People from Somerset
16th-century English women
17th-century English women
17th-century English people
Walsingham family
Ursula
English ladies-in-waiting
Burials at St Paul's Cathedral
Wives of knights
Court of Elizabeth I